A bronze sculpture of Jefferson Davis by Frederick Cleveland Hibbard is installed outside the Alabama State Capitol in Montgomery, Alabama, United States.

Description and history
The statue was dedicated on November 19, 1940. It measures approximately 9 ft. 6 in. x 4 ft. 2 in. x 2 ft., and rests on a base that granite measures approximately 10 ft. 1 in. x 7 ft. 9 1/2 in. x 6 ft. 8 in. The artwork was surveyed by the Smithsonian Institution's "Save Outdoor Sculpture!" program in 1993.

See also
 1940 in art
 Confederate Memorial Monument
 List of Confederate monuments and memorials
 List of memorials to Jefferson Davis

References

External links

 

1940 establishments in Alabama
1940 sculptures
Bronze sculptures in the United States
Confederate States of America monuments and memorials in Alabama
Montgomery
Outdoor sculptures in Alabama
Sculptures of men in Alabama
Statues in Alabama